Year 1052 (MLII) was a leap year starting on Wednesday (link will display the full calendar) of the Julian calendar.

Events 
 By place 

 England 
 Summer – Godwin, Earl of Wessex, sails with a large fleet up the Thames to London, forcing King Edward the Confessor to reinstate him into his previous position of power.

 Africa 
 Battle of Haydaran: The Zirid dynasty is defeated by the invading Bedouin Arab tribes of the Banu Hilal.

 By topic 

 Religion 
 Byōdō-in, a Japanese Buddhist temple (located in the Kyoto Prefecture), changes its name by order of Fujiwara no Yorimichi.

Births 
 May 23 – Philip I (the Amorous), king of France (d. 1108)
 Agnes of Aquitaine, countess of Savoy (approximate date)
 Conrad II (the Child), duke of Bavaria (d. 1055)
 Dirk V, count of Friesland (west of the Vlie) (d. 1091)
 Gleb Svyatoslavich, Kievan prince (approximate date)
 Jón Ögmundsson, Icelandic bishop and saint (d. 1121)
 Robert of Bellême, Norman nobleman (approximate date)
 Roman Svyatoslavich, Kievan prince (approximate date)

Deaths 
 March 6 – Emma of Normandy, queen of England, Denmark and Norway (b. 984)
 May 6 – Boniface III, Italian prince and margrave (assassinated)
 June 19 – Fan Zhongyan, chancellor of the Song Dynasty (b. 989)
 October 4 – Vladimir Yaroslavich, Grand Prince of Kiev (b. 1020)
October 27 – Qirwash ibn al-Muqallad, Uqaylid emir
 December 14 – Aaron Scotus, Irish abbot and musician
 Amadeus I, count of Savoy (approximate date)
 Guaimar IV, Italian nobleman (assassinated)
 Halinard, French archbishop (approximate date)
 Hugh II, count of Ponthieu (also lord of Abbeville)
 Pandulf III, Lombard prince (assassinated)
 Pandulf of Capaccio, Lombard nobleman (assassinated)
 Rodulf, Norman missionary bishop and abbot
 Sweyn Godwinson (or Swein), English nobleman 
 Xu Daoning, Chinese painter (approximate date)
 Xuedou Chongxian, Chinese Buddhist monk

References